Valdma is an Estonian surname. Notable people with the surname include:

Arbo Valdma (born 1942), Estonian pianist and music pedagogue
Viire Valdma (born 1960), Estonian actress

Estonian-language surnames